For over three centuries, the military of the Crimean Khanate and the Nogai Horde conducted several slave raids primarily in lands controlled by Russia and Poland-Lithuania as well as other territories, often under the sponsorship of the Ottoman Empire.

Their main purpose was the capture of slaves, most of whom were exported to the Ottoman slave markets in Constantinople or elsewhere in the Middle East. Genoese and Venetian merchants controlled the slave trade from Crimea to Western Europe. The raids were a drain of the human and economic resources of eastern Europe. They largely inhabited the "Wild Fields" – the steppe and forest-steppe land which extends about five hundred or so miles north of the Black Sea and which now contains most of population of today's south-eastern Ukraine and south-western Russia. The campaigns also played an important role in the development of the Cossacks.

Estimates of the number of people affected vary: Polish historian Bohdan Baranowski assumed that the 17th century Polish–Lithuanian Commonwealth (present-day Poland, Lithuania, Latvia, Estonia, Ukraine, and Belarus) lost an average of 20,000 yearly and as many as one million in total from 1474 to 1694. Mikhail Khodarkhovsky estimates that 150,000 to 200,000 people were abducted from Russia in the first half of the 17th century. 

The first major raid occurred in 1468 and was directed into the south-eastern border of Poland. The last raid into Hungary took place in 1717. In 1769, the last major Tatar raid, which took place during the Russo-Turkish War, saw the capture of 20,000 slaves.

Context

Geographic factors

The steppes of southern Eurasia are flat and most of its societies were either nomadic or semi-nomadic, even those based in urban centers, like Kazan, Crimea, and Astrakhan.

Given the mobility of nomadic nations, warfare and slave trade proved more lucrative than trade because of the wide-open terrain, and the decentralized and fractious powers that Russia encountered on its eastern and southern borders were organized for war, leaving East Slavic lands in a constant state of warfare with numerous potential invaders. Armed mainly with spears, bows and arrows, and sabres, the raiders could travel for hundreds of miles across the steppe without mountain ranges or other natural barriers to impede them, attack villages with little warning, and then leave with captives.  Traveling light and on horseback, the main concern that the Tatars had was finding sufficient fodder for their horses.  Sedentary farming societies, with or without a powerful army, were easy prey for the highly mobile raiders. 

Security on the steppe remained precarious in its wide-open terrain and ever-present danger. Even in the mid-18th century, with greater security at the southern frontier, Russian peasants on the frontier continued to farm their lands fully armed and were often indistinguishable from Cossacks.

Economic factors
Most of the raids fell on territory of today's Russia and Ukraine – lands previously divided between Muscovy and Lithuania, although some fell on Moldavia and Circassia (North Caucasus). A considerable part of the male population of Crimea took part in these campaigns.

The main economic goal of the raids was booty, some of it material, but most of it human. These human trade goods were mostly sold on to the Ottoman Empire, although some remained in Crimea. Slaves and freedmen formed approximately 75% of the Crimean population. According to the Encyclopædia Britannica, "It is known that for every slave the Crimeans sold in the market, they killed outright several other people during their raids, and a couple more died on the way to the slave market." The main slave market was Caffa which after 1475 was part of the coastal strip of Crimea that belonged to the Ottomans. In the 1570s close to 20,000 slaves a year went on sale in Caffa.

Political factors

The Crimean Khanate broke off from the Golden Horde in 1441. When the Horde came to an end in 1502, the buffer between Crimea and its northern neighbors disappeared. The Khans took advantage of the conflicts between Lithuania and Moscow, allying now with one, then with the other, and using the alliance with one as a justification to attack the other. During the Russo-Lithuanian War of 1500–1506 the Crimeans were allied with Russia and penetrated deep into Lithuania. Relations soon deteriorated. Near continuous raids on Muscovy began in 1507.

Crimean Khan Devlet I Giray burnt down Moscow during the 1571 campaign. Contemporaries counted up to 80,000 victims of the Tatar invasion in 1571, with 150,000 Russians taken as captives. Ivan the Terrible, having learnt that Crimean Khanate army was approaching Moscow, fled from Moscow to Kolomna with his oprichniks.

After the burning of Moscow, Devlet Giray Khan, supported by the Ottoman Empire, invaded Russia again in 1572. The combined force of Tatars and Turks, however, this time was repelled in the Battle of Molodi. In July–August, the 120,000-strong Tatar horde was also defeated by the Russian army, led by Prince Mikhail Vorotynsky and Prince Dmitriy Khvorostinin.

In 1620, Tatars took part in the Battle of Cecora, where they vastly contributed to the crushing victory of the Turks over the Poles-Lithuanians. In 1672, Khan Selim I Giray was assigned to join Ottoman army during the Polish–Ottoman War (1672–76) in which he was successful in the conquest of Bar.

Military

Theater of war
At the beginning of this period, between the Crimean Khanate and the Duchy of Moscow lay almost 700 miles of thinly populated grassland, the so-called Wild Fields. The Oka River, 40 miles south of Moscow, was both the principal and last line of defense. It was guarded by the Beregovaya Sluzhba ("river-bank service"). This continued to exist even after the construction of the Belgorod Line far to the south. Its troops rarely crossed the Oka, even when there were massive attacks on the fortresses to the south.

Between Muscovy and Crimea there were three main routes also known as trails. To avoid fords they generally followed the high ground between one river basin and another.

In Crimea and Turkey
The main slave market was at Caffa which after 1475 belonged to the Ottoman Empire. The town had artillery and a strong garrison of Janissaries. Besides Caffa, slaves were sold in Karasubazar, Tuzleri, Bakhchysarai and Khazleve. Slave dealers came from various backgrounds: Turks, Arabs, Greeks, Armenians and Jews. For the right to trade they paid tax to the Crimean Khan and Turkish Pasha. In Caffa there were sometimes as many as 30,000 slaves, mostly from Muscovy and the southeastern lands of the Commonwealth. Habsburg diplomat and the ambassador of the Holy Roman Empire to Muscovy, Sigismund von Herberstein, wrote that "old and infirmed men, who will not fetch much at a sale, are given up to the Tatar youths, either to be stoned, or to be thrown into the sea, or to be killed by any sort of death they might please." A Lithuanian in 1630 wrote:

Alan W. Fisher describes the fate of the slaves:
   

According to Ukrainian-Canadian historian Orest Subtelny, "from 1450 to 1586, eighty-six raids were recorded, and from 1600 to 1647, seventy. Although estimates of the number of captives taken in a single raid reached as high as 30,000, the average figure was closer to 3000...In Podilia alone, about one-third of all the villages were devastated or abandoned between 1578 and 1583."

Michalo Lituanus described Caffa as "an insatiable and lawless abyss, drinking our blood." Besides the bad food, water, clothing and shelter, they were subjected to exhausting labor and abuse. According to Litvin "the stronger slaves were castrated, others had their noses and ears slit and were branded on the forehead or cheek. By day they were tormented with forced labor and at night kept in dungeons." Muslim, Armenians, Jews, and Greek traders all purchased Slavic slaves in Caffa.

See also
 Turkish Abductions
 Barbary slave trade
 Kazakh Khanate slave trade on Russian settlement
 Ottoman wars in Europe
 Slavery in Russia
 Slavery in the Ottoman Empire
 List of Mongol and Tatar attacks in Europe
 Annexation of the Crimean Khanate by the Russian Empire

Footnotes

References

Bibliography
 
 

Tsardom of Russia
Crimean Khanate
Military history of the Polish–Lithuanian Commonwealth
Slavery in the Ottoman Empire
Military operations involving the Crimean Khanate
15th century in the Crimean Khanate
16th century in the Crimean Khanate
17th century in the Crimean Khanate
18th century in the Crimean Khanate
15th-century military history of Russia
16th-century military history of Russia
17th-century military history of Russia
18th-century military history of the Russian Empire
Ottoman slave trade
Nogai people
Ottoman period in Ukraine
History of the Black Sea